A telephone company is a kind of Communications Service Provider (CSP), more precisely a telecommunications service provider (TSP), that provides telecommunications services such as telephony and data communications access. Many telephone companies were at one time government agencies or privately owned but state-regulated monopolies. The government agencies are often referred to, primarily in Europe, as PTTs (postal, telegraph and telephone services).

Telephone companies are common carriers, and in the United States are also called local exchange carriers. With the advent of mobile telephony, telephone companies now include wireless carriers, or mobile network operators.

Most telephone companies now also function as internet service providers (ISPs), and the distinction between a telephone company and an ISP may disappear completely over time, as the current trend for supplier convergence in the industry continues.

In the past, most TSPs were government owned and operated in most countries, due to the nature of capital expenditure involved in it. But today there are many private players in most regions of the world, and even most of the government owned companies have been privatized.

History
In 1913, the Kingsbury Commitment allowed more than 20,000 independent telephone companies in the United States to use the long distance trunks  of Bell Telephone Company.

Popular culture
 Comedian Lily Tomlin frequently satirized the telephone industry (and the country's then-dominant Bell System in particular) with a skit playing the telephone operator Ernestine. Ernestine, who became one of Tomlin's trademark characters, was perhaps most famous for the following line: "We don't care; we don't have to. We're the phone company."
 In the satirical 1967 film The President's Analyst, The Phone Company (TPC) is depicted as plotting to enslave humanity by replacing landlines with brain-implanted mobile phones.
 In the 1988 video game Zak McKracken and the Alien Mindbenders, The Phone Company (TPC) was used by the Caponian aliens to secretly reduce the intelligence of humans.

See also

 Bell Telephone Company, forerunner of AT&T in the U.S.
 Internet telephony service provider
 Competitive local exchange carrier (in Canada and the U.S.)
 Communications service provider
 History of the telephone
 Incumbent local exchange carrier (of the Bell System)
 Individual communication services and tariffs
 List of telephone operating companies
 List of mobile network operators
 Mobile network operator
 Plain old telephone service (POTS)
 Public switched telephone network
 Telecommunications Industry Association (for the development of U.S. telecom standards)
 Regional Bell Operating Company (in the U.S.)
 Service provider

References and notes 
Notes

Citations

Bibliography
 Huurdeman, Anton A. The Worldwide History Of Telecommunications, Wiley-IEEE, 2003,

External links
 Village Telco - site about microtelcos
 Business Telecoms Company - site about business broadband